Sangeetha Mahayuddham, also known as Amul Sangeetha Mahayuddham, is a 2010-2012 Indian reality TV singing competition in the Tamil language that was broadcast on Sun TV.

The show features 6 Indian playback singers who lead their teams of contestants to compete against each other team with a view of winning the Sangeeta Mahayuddham Champion Trophy.

Season 1
The debut season of the show premiered on 19 June 2010, and was hosted by playback singer Chinmayi. The show was telecast on weekend nights.

Teams (season 1)

Thanjai Thalapathigal 
The "Thanjai Thalapathigal" team consisted of:
 Madhu Balakrishnan (playback singer team captain)
 Suchithra
 Kaviya, was 11 years old at the time of the show.
 Bharath

Tirichy Thimingalangal 
The "Tirichy Thimingalangal" team consisted of:
 Srilekha Parthasarathy (playback singer team captain)
 Saisharan, a finalist of Vijay TV's debut season of Airtel Super Singer Junior, and title winner of Airtel super singer senior.
 Vignesh, runner up of Vijay TV's debut season of Airtel Super Singer Junior.
 Manasi, winner of Sun TV's Athiradi Singer.

Nellai Sooraveli 
The "Nellai Sooraveli" team consisted of:
 Annupamaa (playback singer team captain)
 Kousshik Ram
 Krishnamoorthy, winner of Vijay TV's debut season of Airtel Super Singer Junior.
 Monissha

Madurai Veerargal 
The "Madurai Veerargal" team consisted of:
 Vijay Yesudas (playback singer team captain)
 Guruprasad
 Srisha
 Anakah

Chennai Singangal 
The "Chennai Singangal" team consisted of:
 Devan Ekambaram (playback singer team captain)
 Gurupriya
 Aishwarya
 Sasinprabhu

Kovai Killadigal 
The "Kovai Killadigal" team consisted of:
 Mathangi Jagdish (playback singer team captain)
 Al Rufian
 Bhargavi
 Sathyanarayanan

Grand Finale (season 1)
The teams selected for the finale were Srilekha's Tiruchi Thimingalangal and Madhu's Thanjai Thalapathigal.

Srilekha's team members were Saisharan, Vignesh and Manasi, of which Saisharan and Vignesh appeared on music competition reality shows aired on Vijay TV, and Manasi appeared on a music competition reality show aired earlier on Sun TV. Madhu led Suchithra, Kavya and Bharath into the battle.

A special jury consisting of eminent personalities from the Tamil music industry including Vani Jairam judged the finale.

Finale Result (season 1)
The Thanjai Thalapathigal team led by playback singer Madhu Balakrishnan won the competition.

Season 2
The second season of the show premiered on 30 October 2010. Auditions took place in various cities across Tamil Nadu in November 2010. Playback singer and host of season 1, Chinmayi, announced she would not return to host the show for the subsequent season. Her replacement host was playback singer and season 1 captain-contestant, Mathangi Jagdish, Grand Finale on 25 November 2012.

Teams (season 2)

Isai Sooravaligal 
The "Isai Sooravaligal" team consisted of:
 Grace Karunas (playback singer team captain)
 Divyasri
 Febin
 Deepthi

Raaga Deepangal 
The "Raaga Deepangal" team consisted of:
 Ranjith (playback singer team captain)
 Surach
 Preethi Bhargavi
 Ovviya

Paayum Puligal 
The "Paayum Puligal" team consisted of:
 Prasanna (playback singer team captain)
 Diwakar
 Madhumitha Shankar
 Srisha

Singa Kutties 
The "Singa Kutties" team consisted of:
 Sunitha Sarathy (playback singer team captain)
 Roshini
 Guna
 Mukundh

Sangeetha Sudargal 
The "Sangeetha Sudargal" team consisted of:
 Rahul Nambiar (playback singer team captain)
 Ajay
 Kirthika
 Sarath

Paatu Thimingalangal 
The "Paatu Thimingalangal" team consisted of:
 Naveen (playback singer team captain and son of Raveendran)
 Karthik
 Shruthi
 Malvika Sundaresan

References

External links 
 Official Forum
 Sangeetha Mahayuddham
 
 

Sun TV original programming

2010 Tamil-language television series debuts
Tamil-language reality television series
Tamil-language singing talent shows
2012 Tamil-language television series endings
Tamil-language television shows
Television shows set in Tamil Nadu